KMWX (92.5 FM) is a commercial radio station located in Abilene, Texas.  KMWX airs a red dirt country music format branded as "92.5 The Ranch".

History
KULL aired an oldies music format branded as "Kool 92" until April 11, 2005.  In 2005 it became Mix 92.5 with a soft adult contemporary format.  Over the years the format meandered between soft and hot adult contemporary.  The call sign changed. The oldies format that had been on 92.5 resurfaced on KULL-FM at 100.7.
<p>

On January 9, 2023 the station flipped to a Texas and red dirt country format as "92.5 The Ranch", assuming the main signal in a simulcast with sister station KSLI. KMWX Flips to Red Dirt Country</ref>

References

External links
KMWX official website

MWX
Country radio stations in the United States
Radio stations established in 1997
Townsquare Media radio stations